La sfida ("the challenge") is a 1958 Italian film by Francesco Rosi. It stars José Suárez as a gang leader who challenges a local Camorra boss for supremacy. It won the Jury Prize at the Venice Film Festival.

The film is based on the real-life story of Camorra boss Pasquale Simonetti, known as Pasquale 'e Nola, and his wife and former beauty queen Pupetta Maresca, played by Rosanna Schiaffino.

It was produced by the Italian companies Cinecittà and Vides Cinematografica and the Spanish companies Lux Film and Suevia Films.

References

External links
 

1958 films
Italian crime drama films
Films set in Naples
Films about the Camorra
Films directed by Francesco Rosi
Venice Grand Jury Prize winners
Films with screenplays by Suso Cecchi d'Amico
Lux Film films
1950s Italian films